A sub-prefectural municipality, sub-prefectural city, or vice-prefectural municipality, is an unofficial designation for a type of administrative division of China. A sub-prefectural city is officially considered to be a county-level city, but it has more power de facto because the cadres assigned to its government are one half-level higher in rank than those of an "ordinary" county-level city—though still lower than those of a prefecture-level city.

While county-level cities are under the administrative jurisdiction of prefecture-level divisions, sub-prefectural cities are often (but not always) administered directly by the provincial government, with no intervening prefecture level administration.

Examples of sub-prefectural cities that does not belong to any prefecture: Jiyuan (Henan Province), Xiantao, Qianjiang and Tianmen (Hubei), Shihezi, Tumxuk, Aral, and Wujiaqu (Xinjiang).

Examples of sub-prefectural cities that nevertheless belong to a prefecture: Golmud (Haixi, Qinghai), Manzhouli (Hulunbuir, Inner Mongolia).

List of sub-prefectural divisions
Note: Bold not under any prefecture-level subordination

Guangdong
 Gaozhou
 Lufeng
 Luoding
 Nanxiong
 Puning
 Yangchun
 Yingde

Guizhou
 Renhuai

Hainan
 Dongfang
 Qionghai
 Wanning
 Wenchang
 Wuzhishan

Hebei
 Dingzhou
 Qian'an
 Xinji

Heilongjiang
 Suifenhe

Henan
 Dengzhou
 Gongyi
 Jiyuan
 Ruzhou
 Yongcheng

Hubei
 Qianjiang
 Tianmen
 Xiantao

Hunan
 Shaoshan

Inner Mongolia
 Erenhot
 Manzhouli

Jiangsu
 Kunshan
 Taixing

Jiangxi
 Fengcheng
 Gongqingcheng
 Ruijin

Jilin
 Gongzhuling
 Meihekou

Qinghai
 Golmud

Shaanxi
 Hancheng

Xinjiang
Note: all cities are also under the subordination of the Prefecture-level Xinjiang Production and Construction Corps (XPCC or Bingtuan).
 Aral
 Beitun
 Huyanghe
 Kokdala
 Kunyu
 Shihezi
 Shuanghe
 Tiemenguan
 Tumxuk
 Wujiaqu
 '''Xinxing

Zhejiang
 Yiwu

References

Administrative divisions of China
Sub
County-level divisions of the People's Republic of China